The 5 September 1914 election was a double dissolution election which meant all 36 seats in the Senate were up for election, with each Australian states electing six members, with half to serve a six-year term and the rest to serve a three year term.  Terms were taken to have commenced on 1 July 1914. The Senate resolved that in each State the three senators who received the most votes would sit for a six-year term, finishing on 30 June 1920 while the other half would sit for a three-year term, finishing on 30 June 1917.

It was a landslide victory for the Labor Party, which won 31 seats and was the largest party by first preference votes in every state except South Australia. The opposition party, the Commonwealth Liberal Party, won just one seat, which was in South Australia, despite retaining four seats (two each in New South Wales and Tasmania). The Liberal Party lost three seats, one each in New South Wales, Victoria and Tasmania, while Labor lost one seat in New South Wales. Every state except Western Australia and South Australia swung to Labor.

Australia

New South Wales 

Each elector voted for up to six candidates. Percentages refer to the number of voters rather than the number of votes.

Queensland 

Each elector voted for up to six candidates. Percentages refer to the number of voters rather than the number of votes.

South Australia 

Each elector voted for up to six candidates. Percentages refer to the number of voters rather than the number of votes.

Sitting senator Gregor McGregor had re-nominated but died after the close of nominations, leaving Labor with only 5 candidates. Electors were required to vote for 6 candidates or their vote would be invalid. If there was a large informal vote or if the surplus votes were equally distributed there was a risk of Labor losing more than one seat. Labor therefore asked its supporters to vote for John Shannon.

Tasmania 

Each elector voted for up to six candidates. Percentages refer to the number of voters rather than the number of votes.

Victoria 

Each elector voted for up to six candidates. Percentages refer to the number of voters rather than the number of votes.

Western Australia 

Each elector voted for up to six candidates. Percentages refer to the number of voters rather than the number of votes.

See also 

 Candidates of the 1914 Australian federal election
 Results of the 1914 Australian federal election (House of Representatives)
 Members of the Australian Senate, 1914–1917

Notes

References 

1914 elections in Australia
Senate 1914
Australian Senate elections